St. George's Church is a 3rd-century church in Diyarbakır, Turkey. The church was destroyed in the 2023 Turkey–Syria earthquake.

References 

Buildings damaged by the 2023 Turkey–Syria earthquake
3rd-century churches
Buildings and structures in Diyarbakır
Churches in Turkey